John Adolf Fredrik Zander (31 January 1890 – 9 June 1967) was a Swedish middle-distance runner who competed at the 1912 and  1920 Summer Olympics in the 1500 m and 3000 m events.

In 1912 he finished seventh and tenth, respectively. Although his 3,000 m team placed second he did not receive a medal because only three best runners from a team were counted, while he was fourth. The 1916 Olympics were cancelled due to World War I. At the 1920 Games Zander failed to finish his 1500 m race. He helped Sweden to qualify for the final in the 3000 metre team race but he did not run in the final, in which Sweden won the bronze medal.

Nationally Zander won 10 Swedish titles, in the 800 m (1912–13), 1,500 m (1913, 1915–18), steeplechase (1915) and 5,000 m (1917–18). He also won one mile race at the English AAA Championship; 3,000 and 5,000 m events at the 1914 Baltic Games, and four events at the 1916 Swedish Games. He semi-retired in 1918, and had a rib injury while preparing for the 1920 Olympics. During his career he set Swedish records in the 1,500 and 5,000 m and world records over 1,500, 2,000 and 3,000 metres. In retirement he worked as an actuary for the Pension Board in Stockholm.

References

1890 births
1967 deaths
Swedish male long-distance runners
Swedish male middle-distance runners
Swedish male steeplechase runners
Olympic athletes of Sweden
Athletes (track and field) at the 1912 Summer Olympics
Athletes (track and field) at the 1920 Summer Olympics
World record setters in athletics (track and field)
Athletes from Stockholm